CXR may mean;
 Charing Cross Road, a street in London, United Kingdom
 Chest X-ray, a projection radiograph of the thorax
 Christmas Island (via ISO 3166-1 country code)
 Carrier signal, in US telephony jargon
 Cam Ranh International Airport, IATA code CXR
 CXR Anderson Jacobson, a vendor of communications equipment